Carisi is a surname. Notable people with the surname include:

Dominick Carisi Jr., fictional police detective, and later Assistant District Attorney, on Law & Order: Special Victims Unit
John Carisi (1922–1992), American trumpeter and composer